Jackie Amezquita (born August 10, 1985) is a performance artist known for her work exploring power structures and the effects of them on ourselves and our environment. She is influenced by her experiences as an immigrant woman here in the United States, often referencing the relationship she now has with borders. She puts together what she refers to as a “visual language” through weaving and the use of her own body. Her pieces are known to challenge the systems of power dominating our country today.

Early life and education 
Amezquita was born in Quetzaltenango, Guatemala and lived there with her grandmother until she was about 17 years old. At this age, she decided to cross the border and travel to Los Angeles, California where she met her mother. Her mother had traveled to Los Angeles when Amezquita was two years old, so they reunited after almost 15 years.

She received an Associate’s Degree in Visual Communications from Los Angeles Valley College and her Bachelor’s in Fine Art from ArtCenter College of Design. She is currently a Master’s of Fine Arts candidate at the University of California, Los Angeles.

Notable works 
 Proclamacion (2020)
 17 people gathered to eat with only their hands; depicts the plates of food before and after gathering
 De Norte a Sur (2019)
 a performance piece in which she went from the Mexico–United States border to the Guatemala–Mexico border
 Huellas Que Germinan (2018)
 performance piece in which she walked from Tijuana, Mexico to Los Angeles, California in silence, in only 8 days

Notable exhibitions 
 Suenos Fertiles (Fertile Dreams), ArtCenter College of Design in Pasadena, California, Summer 2018
 Tension, with Tanya Aguiñiga, Museum of Arts and Design in Manhattan, New York, Spring 2018
 I Am the American Dream, Studio 50 Gallery in Highland Park, California, Spring 2018

References

External links 
 Jackie Amezquita’s website

Living people
1985 births
21st-century women artists
Art Center College of Design alumni
Guatemalan women artists
People from Quetzaltenango
Performance artists
Wikipedia Student Program